John M. "Pat" Lynch was an American politician who served and as the twenty third and twenty fifth Mayor of Somerville, Massachusetts. He was the Massachusetts Democratic Party Chair from 1956 to 1962.

Early life and career
Lynch grew up in Somerville and graduated from the College of the Holy Cross in 1926. In 1929 he was elected to the Somerville Board of Aldermen by seven votes. He would serve a total of three terms as Alderman.

Mayor of Somerville
In 1938, Lynch became Mayor of Somerville. He remained in office until 1943, when he resigned to join the United States Navy. During World War II he served as a lieutenant commander in the Caribbean. From 1950 to 1953 he once again served as mayor. He became the first five-term mayor in the history of Somerville.

Chairman of the Massachusetts Democratic Party
Lynch supported John F. Kennedy during his first run for the United States House of Representatives. In 1956, at Kennedy's request, Lynch ran for and was elected to the position of state party chairman. Kennedy supported John M. Lynch for the position of chairman because he, like Kennedy, supported Adlai Stevenson for the party's presidential nomination in 1956, but was not too close to Kennedy. Kennedy felt that if someone who was close to him personally was chosen as chairman, it would appear that chairman William H. Burke, Jr. was removed for personal gain and not to better the party. Lynch defeated Burke by 47 votes to 31 at the 1956 convention.

As chairman, Lynch, he laid much of the groundwork for Kennedy's 1960 presidential campaign in Massachusetts and traveled with him throughout most of the primary states.

Customs collector
In 1962, Lynch was appointed collector of customs in the Port of Boston. He was later offered the position of customs collector for all of New England by President Lyndon B. Johnson but declined and instead chose to retire.

Death
Lynch died on November 14, 1984 in Somerville.

Notes

1984 deaths
College of the Holy Cross alumni
Massachusetts Democrats
Mayors of Somerville, Massachusetts
Massachusetts Democratic Party chairs
Year of birth missing
Collectors of the Port of Boston